The 2011 Troy Trojans football team represented Troy University in the 2011 NCAA Division I FBS football season. The Trojans were led by 21st-year head coach Larry Blakeney and played their home games at Veterans Memorial Stadium. They are members of the Sun Belt Conference. They finished the season 3–9, 2–6 in Sun Belt play to finish in seventh place.

Schedule

References

Troy
Troy Trojans football seasons
Troy Trojans football